Nuno Martins da Silveira (1380-1450s) was a Portuguese nobleman, Lord and alcaide of Terena. Escrivão da puridade, (King's private secretary) of Afonso V in 1450.

Biography 

Nuno was the son of Martim Gil Pestana and Maria Gonçalves da Silveira. His wife was Leonor Falcão daughter of João Falcão, and maternal granddaughter of Gonçalo Anes de Abreu.

References 

14th-century Portuguese people
15th-century Portuguese people
Portuguese nobility
Portuguese Roman Catholics